Keith Ross McPhee (10 July 1914 – 5 May 1995) was an Australian rules footballer who played with Fitzroy in the Victorian Football League (VFL).		

McPhee enlisted and served in the Australian Army during World War II, seeing service in Port Moresby and Borneo.

Notes

External links 

1914 births
1995 deaths
Australian rules footballers from Victoria (Australia)
Fitzroy Football Club players